Guntur division may mean:
Guntur revenue division
Guntur railway division